The Canadian Silver Maple Leaf is a silver bullion coin that is issued annually by the Government of Canada since 1988. It is produced by the Royal Canadian Mint.

The Silver Maple Leaf is legal tender. The face value is 5 Canadian dollars. The market value of the metal varies, depending on the spot price of silver. The 99.99% silver content makes the coin among the finest official bullion coins worldwide. The standard version has a weight of 1 troy ounce (31.10 grams).

The Silver Maple Leaf's obverse and reverse display, respectively, the profile of Elizabeth II and the Canadian Maple Leaf. In 2014, new security features were introduced: radial lines and a micro-engraved laser mark.

Information
The Silver Maple Leaf is issued annually by the Government of Canada. Introduced in 1988 by the Royal Canadian Mint, there have been three subsequent standard editions  and several special editions.

The Silver Maple Leaf's obverse displays the profile of Elizabeth II. There have been three subsequent versions of the Queen's profile:

 1988–1989: Portrait by Arnold Machin.
 1990–2003: Portrait by Dora de Pédery-Hunt.
 Since 2004: Portrait by Susanna Blunt.

The Silver Maple Leaf's reverse displays the Canadian Maple Leaf. This design has remained unchanged since 1988. In 2014, however, new security features were introduced: radial lines and a micro-engraved laser mark. Also the obverse was affected by this.

The phrases CANADA and <small>FINE SILVER 1 OZ ARGENT PUR</small> are universal elements.

Granted a face value of 5 Canadian dollars, the Silver Maple Leaf has status as legal tender. It has also a market value that depends on the spot price of silver and that normally exceeds the nominal face value. With few exceptions and alike similar international bullion coins, the Silver Maple Leaf has a weight of 1 troy ounce (31.10 grams). The 99.99% silver content makes the coin among the finest official bullion coins worldwide.

Samples of the Silver Maple Leaf often carry a blemish that has a milky-white appearance, called a milk spot. This happens when a cleaning detergent is left on the coin when it goes into the annealing furnace.. This issue was addressed in 2018 with the RCM introduction of "MINTSHIELD" surface protection technology to prevent milk spots.

The Silver Maple Leaf was originally packaged in Mylar. Since 2009, due to increasing demand, it is packaged in semi-transparent tubes with a yellow lid bearing the RCM logo. Some special editions have tubes with an orange, red, blue, dark blue or grey lid. Each tube contains 25 coins. Furthermore, there exist boxes that contain 20 tubes each.

Mintage (all uncirculated bulk coins)

The issue from the year 2000 was sold as an uncirculated bulk coin yet bears the Fireworks privy mark on it. 
It is re-listed in the special privy mark section below but is still essentially part of the standard bullion series.

Special editions
Special editions may, in this article, be divided into the following subcategories:

 Commemorative editions
 Editions with special privy marks
 Fractional editions
 Editions with nature-related themes
 Coloured and hologram editions

In 1998, marking the 10th anniversary of the Silver Maple Leaf series, a single-issue 10-ounce version was produced. The Silver Maple Leaf (SML), a staple of pure silver bullion, was only produced in 1oz coins. It was only for the commemoration of the 10th anniversary of the SML, that a reverse proof 10oz Silver Maple Leaf was struck. Unfortunately, due to price ($200, silver spot ~$6) and lack of interest, the planned 30,000 10oz SMLs were not sold out, and more than half were taken back for melting. Their cases were also recycled for one of the 2004 2oz bimetallic coins that the RCM issued. This is also the reason that some of the silver COAs will number above 14,000, though only around 13,000 of the coins survived.

In 1999, many Silver Maple Leaf coins were issued with a privy mark to commemorate the 20th anniversary of the RCM Maple Leaf Program. In the following year, the coins featured a privy mark with fireworks and the number 2000. Another Silver Maple Leaf version was issued to commemorate the millennium. The coins were double-dated 1999 and 2000.

Some of the privy-marked Silver Maple Leaf versions were available only in Europe. In 2005, the Liberation of the Netherlands triple privy silver Maple Leaf—the rarest of all Silver Maple Leaf coins—was struck by the Royal Canadian Mint for the Royal Dutch Mint. The first coin produced by the facility, graded SP70 on the Sheldon scale, was to be presented to Queen Beatrix of the Netherlands.

In 2005, The Royal Canadian Mint issued The North America LEGACY of LIBERTY pure silver commemorative coin set, with two coins dated 2004 and two coin dated 2005. Also included in the set was the first poppy colourized quarter (2005), a Royal Canadian Legion symbol of remembrance, hope, and sacrifice. Three 1oz pure silver maple leaf coins with privy marks were made:  Victory Europe Day - May 8, 1945 (2005), Victory Japan Day - September 2, 1945 (2005) and D-Day - June 6th 1944 (2004), with only 4200 sets being minted.

There are also special edition R.C.M. coins called the 'Maple Leaf Forever' series, with there being three maple leaf symbols on the reverse. The mint has minted 100,000 of this design in 1/2 oz .9999 fine silver coins and 200 strikes of the same design in a large 60mm diameter .9999 fine gold coin. Many other Royal Canadian Mint coins feature maple leaf symbols, such as the $20 for $20 series, the 'Piedfort Maple' series, the 5 oz silver 25th anniversary coins, 1 oz silver 25th anniversary coins with gold guild clad (an identical coin is minted in 1 oz of .9995 fine platinum) and fractional 25th anniversary coins in silver and gold. There are also the 1 kg $250 coins 2011–2015 with mintage numbers 999, 1200, 600, 600, 500 respectively.

2 other series noted by argent pur signa include the SML edge lettering 20 coins which includes:

2013 Bald Eagle-  7,500

- Bald Eagle #1 - Portrait of Power
                                      
- Bald Eagle #2 - Lifelong Mates
                                           
- Bald Eagle #3 - Deadly Predator
                                       
- Bald Eagle #4 - Mother Protecting  Baby Eaglets
               
2014 Bison Bull – Complete 7,500

- Bison Bull  #1 - Buffalo Proof
              
- Bison Bull  #2 - Bull and His Mate
           
- Bison Bull  #3 - The Fight
                
- Bison Bull  #4 - Family At Rest
               
2014 White-Tailed Deer - 7,500

- White-Tailed Deer #1 - Portrait of a 10-Point Buck
                              
- White-Tailed Deer #2 - Challenge for Power - Two Bucks Fighting
     
- White-Tailed Deer #3 - Mates Leaping Over a Fallen Pine Log
          
- White-Tailed Deer #4 - A Doe and Her Fawns

2015 Sportfish of North America - 6500

- Largemouth Bass Game Trophy Fish $20
 				
- Northern Pike Game Trophy Fish $20 Pure
                                           
- Walleye Game Trophy Fish $20 Pure Silver
                                           
- Rainbow Trout Trophy Fish $20 Pure Silver
                                         
2015-2016 Great Grizzly Bear -    6500
 
- Canada 2015 Great Grizzly Bear #1 - The Catch
                                    
- Canada 2015 Great Grizzly Bear #2 - Togetherness
                               
- Canada 2015 Great Grizzly Bear #3 - Family
                                       
- Canada 2016 Great Grizzly Bear #4 - The Battle for Dominance

2014 $20 The Seven Sacred Teachings: SML argent pur   mintage 7,000
    
-1- Love eagle
                                                                         
-2- Respect bison or buffalo
                                                
-3- Courage Grizzly bear
                                                     
-4- Honest Raven
                                                                
-5- Wisdom Beaver and Poplar Tree
                                  
-6- Humility Wolf
                                                                 
-7- Truth Turtle

Commemorative editions

Anniversaries

Editions with special privy marks

Anniversaries and commemorations (1 oz CAD$5 coins)

Zodiac series (1998–2009)

Zodiac series (2012–)

Fabulous series

Sets

Editions with nature-related themes

Fine silver fractional four-coin sets

Canadian Wildlife Series

Birds of Prey Series

Predator Series

Canadian Arctic Series 1½ oz

Other Silver Maple Leaf coins

Hologram Silver Maple Leaf

Olympic Maple Leaf

See also

 American Silver Eagle
 Australian Silver Kangaroo
 Silver Britannia
 Canadian Gold Maple Leaf
 Big Maple Leaf
 Canadian Platinum Maple Leaf
 Silver as an investment

References

External links
 Royal Canadian Mint's Official Website
 Royal Canadian Mint Act

Five-base-unit coins
Silver Maple Leaf
Silver bullion coins